Khmer sastra is a sastra, or manuscript, written during and after the Khmer Empire, from at least the 12th century, in Southeast Asia.

Khmer sastras are written in the pali language, and some in Khmer, on a variety of material, mostly dried palm leaves from the Corypha lecomtei palm tree, ordered and tied together in what is known as an olla book or palm-leaf manuscript. The tradition of producing olla books in Cambodia goes back as far as the influence of Indian civilization in the region and the tradition of Khmer sastras is at least contemporaneous with the introduction of Buddhism and other religions of Indian origin in the Khmer realm. Their presence in Cambodia is attested with certainty in a 12th-century bas-relief in the grandiose Angkor Wat temple, depicting an apsara (female spirit) holding an olla book. The Chinese visitor Zhou Daguan, who toured the Khmer capital in 1292, also relates in his travelogue that monks would recite daily prayers read from books made of "very evenly stacked palm leaves".

Khmer literature is generally divided into three main categories, namely Tes, containing sacred Buddhist knowledge, Sāstrā lbaeng with literary verses of a rich vocabulary for general entertainment, and the technical Kbuon containing knowledge of medicine, pharmacopoeia, astronomy, law, chronicles, magics, divination or demonology.

Apart from sastra olla books, the ancient Khmers also made paper books (from mulberry bark) known as Kraing and wrote on stone, metals, and human skin (tattoos) but rarely used animal hide or skins.

Libraries 
During the Angkorian era, Khmer sastras were made by monks in the Khmer temples and stored in monastery libraries. Constructed from wood, these libraries were sometimes fitted with a multi-tiered roof, sitting in the middle of small ponds, to protect them from termites. Our knowledge about these ancient libraries has only been inferred from the area of present-day Thailand, then part of the Angkorian empire. In Thailand, they are known as  ho trai today.

In the 16th century, a substantial body of Buddhist literature was created in the Cambodian temples. In later times, up to the present, pagodas served as library storehouses of Khmer sastras and literary works.

Palm-leaves gets attacked by mold, insects, moisture and weather, especially in a tropical climate, and in order to preserve Khmer sastras, a strategy of minute copying has been the usual recipe for the Buddhist monks. Because of this practice, most of the present day Khmer sastras were probably produced in the 19th century, as copies of former times sastras.

Legacy 
In the 13th century, the Khmer Empire gradually declined, large parts of the kingdom were conquered by neighboring cultures, such as the Siamese and Chams, founding what became the Ayutthaya Kingdom (predecessor of modern-day Thailand) and south Vietnam respectively. At the same time the official state religion of the Khmers changed from Brahmanism and Mahayana Buddhism to Theravada Buddhism. Combined, the result was that much of the former legacy of the Khmer sastras became absorbed by the Thai culture or was forgotten.

In the course of the Cambodian civil war and the subsequent upheavals of the Khmer Rouge regime in the 1960s and 1970s, an estimated 80% of Cambodian pagodas had their libraries destroyed and a large number of monks perished as well. More than half of the Khmer literary legacy from before 1975 was lost in these years. The surviving Khmer sastras are now kept in Cambodian pagodas, the National Library of Cambodia and a multitude of institutes across the world, including Bibliothèque Nationale de Paris. Only a few monks in present-day Cambodia have expert knowledge of how to craft sastras.

Since the 1980s, several groups, organizations and institutes in Cambodia and abroad are working for the preservation of the Khmer sastras for the future. Many of the ancient manuscripts have now been digitized. The effort is almost exclusively directed at preserving former Khmer sastras, very few people are crafting new ones.

See also 
 Buddhism in Cambodia
 History of Buddhism in Cambodia
 Cambodian literature
 Folding-book manuscript

References

Sources 
  Public database of digitized manuscripts.

External links 
  Public database of digitized manuscripts.
  Public database of digitized manuscripts.

Manuscripts by type
Cambodian literature
Buddhism in Cambodia
Buddhist literature